Rafael Rojas (born Rafael Humberto Rojas Morales on April 16, 1961 in San José, Costa Rica) is a Costa Rican former male fashion model and actor of telenovelas and of the cinema of Mexico.

Biography
Rafael started his acting career in a play at the age of 7. When he was 19 he married and had a daughter Isla, who still lives in Costa Rica. At the age of 22 he moved to Mexico and obtained  small role in a college film and in the telenovela La pobre señorita Limantour. A year later he participated i the film La segua. His big break came three years later as the love interest of the character played by singer Thalía in Quinceañera.

 he has worked in 20 telenovelas, including Teresa with Salma Hayek and Amor real, the TVyNovelas Award "Best Telenovela of the Year" in 2003. He almost did not get the part of Amadeo Corona in Amor real because he was touring the country with one of his plays. After showing interest in the telenovela the role was re-written so that he could still play the part.

In 2004 he participated in the biographic film of telenovela producer Juan Osorio. A year later he also recorded an album of pre-Hispanic music and started filming a new telenovela titled Flor de campo.

In Mexico he married María Magdadlena with whom he has had two daughters: Neshkala and Mar. 

Rojas has returned to Costa Rica, where, as of 2023, he owns two farms.

Films

 Despertar (2017)
 Sala de espera (2005)
 Los zapatos de Muddy Mae (2005)
 Amores circulares (2004)
 Mi verdad (2004) as "El Flaco"
 ¿Y si te mueres? (2000)
 Chevrolet (1997) as a cop
 Mujeres infieles (1994) as the architect Muñoz
 La sombra del delator (1993)
 Sangre y arena (1989) as Maletilla
 La segua (1984)

Telenovelas
 El Final del Camino (2017)
 Vidas Robadas (2010) as Pedro Antonio Fernández Vidal
 Eternamente tuya (2009) as Hernán
 Pasión (2007) as Coronel José María de Valencia
 Duelo de Pasiones (2006) as Maximo
 Mariana de la noche (2003) as Gerardo
 Amor real (2003) as Amadeo Corona
 Rayito de luz (2000) as Antonio Sánchez
 Carita de ángel (2000) as Gaspar
 Siempre te amaré (2000) as Patricio Mistral
 Serafín (1999) as Enrique
 María Isabel (1997-1998) as Rigoberto
 El alma no tiene color (1997) as Luis Diego Morales
 La sombra del otro (1996) as Manuel
 Si Dios Me Quita La Vida (1995) as Francesco
 Clarisa (1993) as Dario Bracho Sanabria
 Valentina (1993) as Julio
 Baila conmigo (1992) as Bruno
 Yo no creo en los hombres (1991) as Arturo
 Mi pequeña Soledad (1990) as Lalo
 Teresa (1989) as Mario
 Morir para vivir (1989)
 Amor en silencio (1988) as Sebastián
 Quinceañera (1987) as Gerardo
 La pobre Señorita Limantour (1987)
 El engaño (1986) as Reynaldo
 Martín Garatuza (1986) as César

Theater
 Final de viernes ("Friday's finale")
 Aquel tiempo de campeones ("Those days of champions")
 Mi mujer se llama Mauricio ("Mi wife's name is Maurice")

See also
List of Costa Ricans

References

External links
 Rafael Rojas at the telenovela database
  Rafael Rojas at esmas.com
 

1961 births
Costa Rican male models
Costa Rican emigrants to Mexico
Living people
People from San José, Costa Rica